XLAB d.o.o. is an IT company based in Slovenia and focused on remote desktop technology, management and automation of hybrid infrastructure, and data analytics.

Research 

XLAB is among largest Slovenian private computer science research groups and 1st SME in Slovenia in terms of H2020 funded research projects.

XLAB's main area of research is focused on the following fields:

 Management & Automation – SODALITE, RADON, 
 Security & Privacy – FISHY,
 IoT – PIXEL,
 Data Analytics – iPC.

ISL Online 
ISL Online is software for secure remote desktop access, live chat and video conferencing over the web. The software is available for Microsoft Windows, OS X, Linux, iOS, and Android operating systems. ISL Online is used by both smaller companies and corporations in Slovenia and abroad; Teleroute (Belgium), Telekom Slovenije (Slovenia), Azteca (Mexico), Canon Inc. (Japan), Swiss Post (Switzerland) etc. L. 2016 is a Japanese market research and consulting company, Seed Planning Inc. declared ISL Online the leading remote support software provider in Japan, with a 44% market share.

References 

Remote desktop
Software companies of Slovenia
Companies based in Ljubljana
Slovenian companies established in 2001
Software companies established in 2001
Slovenian brands